Shantanu Maheshwari (born 7 March 1991) is an Indian actor, dancer, choreographer and host. He debuted with the show Dil Dosti Dance on Channel V in his breakthrough performance as the protagonist Swayam Shekhawat. In 2017, he participated in Fear Factor: Khatron Ke Khiladi 8 and emerged as the winner. He was also seen as a contestant on Jhalak Dikhhla Jaa 9 and Nach Baliye 9 and became a finalist in both. He is a part of the Desi Hoppers dance crew who emerged as the winners in the World of Dance 2015 Championship in Los Angeles. Maheshwari made his Bollywood debut in 2022, with Sanjay Leela Bhansali's Gangubai Kathiawadi opposite Alia Bhatt.

Early life
Maheshwari was born on 7 March 1991 in Kolkata, India in a well-to-do Marwadi Family. He attended The Park English School, Kolkata and St. Joseph's College, Kolkata He moved to Mumbai for his higher studies where he attended H.R. College of Commerce and Economics and was a part of the Street Soul Dance Crew [SSDC] from his college. Maheshwari is versatile as a dancer but specializes mainly in Popping and (Liquid) Waving.

Career 
Maheshwari began his acting career with Dil Dosti Dance for Channel V.  He rose to fame by essaying the role of Swayam Shekhawat during the four-years run of the show. His chemistry with co-star Vrushika Mehta earned him widespread adulation as they went on to win the third spot in the Hottest Indian TV Jodi list by the UK-based newspaper Eastern Eye.
The duo also earned the ITA Award for Onscreen Couple of the Year in 2014.

In 2015, he appeared in Zing's episodic show Pyaar Tune Kya Kiya where he played the role of a cancer patient. He returned to the small screen with his Dil Dosti Dance co-star Vrushika Mehta in Yeh Hai Aashiqui on Bindass, playing an episodic character of a verbally-challenged law student. He also dubbed for some episodes of Yeh Hai Aashiqui. In 2015, Maheshwari appeared in the Bindass show Bindass Naach. The finite series, which had appearances by the likes of Jaja Vaňková and Terence Lewis, showcased the formation of his crew Desi Hoppers and their subsequent victory at World of Dance 2015. Desi Hoppers became the first dance crew in the history to represent India at World of Dance and win it too. The crew was invited to give a special performance on America's Got Talent 11 and received praise from the judges Simon Cowell, Heidi Klum and Nick Cannon. It was also invited to give a special performance on China's famous talk show Day Day Up.

Maheshwari returned to fiction shows with MTV India's Girls On Top playing an aspiring musician Sahir Bhasin.

In 2016, Maheshwari participated in the celebrity dance reality show Jhalak Dikhhla Jaa 9 on Colors TV. He was one of the most consistent performers in the show and became the most popular and strongest contender for the title. He received praises from seasoned actor and ex-Jhalak contestant Ronit Roy who called him the winner of the show. Bollywood star Hrithik Roshan called Maheshwari a "flying star". However, he lost the trophy to Teriya Magar and Salman Yusuff Khan  and became the 2nd runner-up.

In 2017, he starred in a short film Something Like Love which marked his foray into the digital cinema. Maheshwari participated in Fear Factor: Khatron Ke Khiladi 8 which was shot in Spain and hosted by Bollywood director Rohit Shetty. He was the most consistent performer and got in the danger zone for the fewest times. Rohit Shetty called him the "silent killer" of the show. He won the show by beating Hina Khan and Ravi Dubey in the finale.
Along with his dance crew Desi Hoppers, Maheshwari was invited to perform an exhibition act at the World of Dance 2017 finals in Los Angeles.

The crew also went on to perform at Asian Battleground, a cross-national dance reality show shot in Malaysia. Among the twelve dance crews that participated in the competition, Desi Hoppers came 3rd in the showcase rankings and were a part of the top 4 finalists that advanced for the face-off round. 

In 2018, Maheshwari hosted MTV India's episodic series Love on the Run. Maheshwari then along with his crew Desi Hoppers participated in the world's biggest dance reality show World of Dance (TV series) and in doing so they became the first-ever Indian dance crew to represent India on such a big platform. They received high praise from judges Jennifer Lopez, Ne-Yo and Derek Hough who loved their unique style and fusion of hip-hop with Indian culture. They also scored an impressive 96 to qualify for the next round which was also the highest score in round one. Maheshwari launched the spring collection of Lee Cooper with #MasterofDenim look. He also gained popularity as the host of Zee TV's reality show India's Best Dramebaaz, which later won the Favorite Non-Fiction Show award at Zee Rishtey Awards.

Along with his crew, Desi Hoppers, Maheshwari gave special performances at the University of Oxford, UK, as part of a social entrepreneur summit with the likes of Academy Award winner Chiwetel Ejiofor, Grammy award winner Sarah McLachlan and chief international anchor for CNN, Christiane Amanpour present. Maheshwari has also given numerous stage performances on Indian Television Academy Awards, Radio Mirchi Top 20 & Golden Petal Awards on Colors TV,&TV It's Diwali, Nickelodeon Kids' Choice Awards India, DID Li'l Masters (Season 4 Finale) & Gold Awards on Zee TV, Adbhut Ganesh Utsav and Dandiya Nights over the years.

Owing to his influence on aspiring youth, IIMUN invited Shantanu to be one of the motivational speakers of IIMUN championship conference MUNCLAVE 2019. Shantanu along with Desi Hoppers has choreographed and directed dance performances for the Zee TV show Yeh Teri Galiyan. Shantanu also appeared in a promotional video by Netflix for The Umbrella Academy (TV series) with Tiku Talsania, Supriya Pilgaonkar and Kubbra Sait. His third music video composed by Qaran and sung by Ash King on Sony Music India named "Haaye Oye" featuring Elli Avram opposite him, crossed 45 million views on YouTube within two weeks and trended on various music platforms. He has performed the character of Abir Basu in Ekta Kapoor's web series Medically Yours. The web series fetched a 8.8 IMDb rating and Shantanu's performance was much appreciated. He received Likee's Digital Influencer award as the Youth Icon of the year for the same. He along with his partner became the finalist of Nach Baliye season-9.

Maheshwari starred opposite Alia Bhatt in Sanjay Leela Bhansali's Gangubai Kathiawadi in 2022. The film marks his debut in Bollywood.

Filmography

Films

Television

Music videos

Web series

Awards and nominations

See also
 List of dancers

References

External links

 
 

Indian male dancers
Living people
Artists from Kolkata
Reality dancing competition winners
Indian contemporary dancers
Male actors in Hindi cinema
Male actors from Kolkata
Indian male television actors
Indian choreographers
Participants in Indian reality television series
1991 births
Fear Factor: Khatron Ke Khiladi participants